Kombaki (also Romanized as Kombakī) is a village in Piveshk Rural District, Lirdaf District, Jask County, Hormozgan Province, Iran. At the 2006 census, its population was 394, in 101 families.

References 

Populated places in Jask County